Italy participated in the Junior Eurovision Song Contest 2022 in Yerevan, Armenia. Italian broadcaster RAI is responsible for the country's participation in the contest. Chanel Dilecta represented Italy with the song "Bla Bla Bla".

Background

On the country's most recent appearance, in 2019, the Italian broadcaster internally selected Marta Viola to represent Italy at the contest with the song "". She achieved seventh place with 129 points.

Italy withdrew from the 2020 contest due to the COVID-19 pandemic, and despite initially announcing that they would not return in 2021, they ultimately announced their participation in the 2021 contest in France.

Before Junior Eurovision 
On 3 November 2022, RAI announced that 13-year-old Chanel Dilecta will represent Italy with the song "Bla Bla Bla". The song and music video were released a week later.

At Junior Eurovision 
After the opening ceremony, which took place on 5 December 2022, it was announced that Italy would perform fifth on 11 December 2022, following Malta and preceding France.

Voting

Detailed voting results

References 

Italy
Junior
Junior Eurovision Song Contest